The following is an incomplete list of alumni of Stanford Law School.

Law and government

United States government

Executive branch

Legislative branch

Judicial branch

Supreme Court 

 Sandra Day O'Connor (1952), first female U.S. Supreme Court Justice (1981–2006)
 William Rehnquist (1952), 16th Chief Justice of the United States (1986–2005), Associate Justice of the Supreme Court (1972–1986)

Courts of Appeals

District Courts

State judiciary

Non-United States government 

 Chen Show Mao (1992), Member of Parliament, Singapore
 Sian Elias (JSM 1972), Chief Justice of New Zealand
 Ronald Kenneth Noble (1982), Secretary General of Interpol and law professor

Other government

Academia

Activism

Business

Media and journalism

Other

References 

Stanford University-related lists
Stanford Law